Elemeno P is a New Zealand rock band. The band's first album, Love & Disrespect was released on 4 July 2003, and reached number one on the RIANZ albums chart. Their second album, Trouble in Paradise was released on 24 November 2005 and includes the singles "11:57", "Burn", "One Left Standing", and "You Are". Their third album, Elemeno P was released on 26 May 2008.

Elemeno P has been referred to as New Zealand's biggest selling rock band and in 2006 won Best Group at the New Zealand Music Awards.

Band members 
Current
 Scotty Pearson – drums, backing vocals
 Dave Gibson – vocals, (baritone)
 Justyn Pilbrow – guitar, backing vocals
 Lani Purkis – bass, backing vocals
Live performance members
Godfrey DeGrut – guitar, keyboard, saxophone, percussion
Jessie Booth – guitar, keyboard, backing vocals
Former members
 Paul Gerring – bass, backing vocals (2001–2003)
 Dave Goodison – guitar, backing vocals (2009–2011)

During Elemeno P's set at the 2009 Big Day Out it was announced that founding member Justyn Pilbrow would be leaving the band to seek opportunities overseas.  The guitarist standing in for the live shows is Dave Goodison, formerly of Garageland and the City Newton Bombers. He returned to the band in late 2011.

In May 2009, Elemeno P announced they are currently writing new material for a new album (described by Pearson as a "story-so-far album"), a timeframe for release is yet to be confirmed.

December 2011 saw Elemeno P release a new song called Slow Down Boy which they allowed fans to download for free after sharing on Twitter or Facebook.

In an interview on The Edge radio station in January 2012, Dave Gibson has said that the band plan on releasing a greatest hits album with a couple of new tracks in March 2012, along with a tour.

Tours
The band have toured with the Australian band End of Fashion. Elemeno P toured New Zealand to promote their album Trouble in Paradise in late 2005/early 2006. This was part of the Summer Burn Tour which included New Zealand bands Deja Voodoo, Steriogram and Shihad (Christchurch show only).
The band has also toured with Goodnight Nurse, performing all age gigs around New Zealand. In the 2007/08 summer, Elemeno P toured New Zealand with The Feelers and Atlas.

Winter 2008 saw Elemeno P, Streetwise Scarlett and Deja Voodoo tour New Zealand playing all the main centres and many small towns.

Elemeno P teamed up with New Zealand music legends Supergroove in the summer of 2008/2009 for the Rock and Roll Caravan tour, playing all the summer hotspots such as the Coroglen Tavern, Riwaka Hotel, and (with Shihad and The Datsuns) the Lake Hawea Motor Inn.

In January 2011 they were a headliner for the annual Christian Parachute Music Festival. In March 2011 they played at the Jim Beam Homegrown festival.

Dave Gibson has said in an interview with The Edge radio station 7 January 2012 that the band was looking at a tour in March 2012 to promote their greatest hits album which is currently in the works.

In March 2017, the members of Elemeno P are coming together from the US and Auckland to play shows in Auckland, Christchurch and at Wellington's Homegrown festival.

Discography

Albums

Singles

References

External links

AudioCulture profile
muzic.net.nz – Elemeno P
Elemeno P Online (Fansite)
Elemeno P Interview at NZRock.com

New Zealand rock music groups